KASD may refer to:

 Slidell Airport, Louisiana, USA (ICAO code KASD)
 KASD (FM), a radio station (90.3 FM) licensed to serve Rapid City, South Dakota, United States